"More and More" is a song by German Eurodance music project Captain Hollywood Project. It was released in July 1992 as the first single from their first album, Love Is Not Sex (1993). The song reached  1 in Germany and was a top-five hit in Austria, Belgium, Denmark, Israel, Italy, Norway, Sweden and Switzerland. It also found success in Australia and North America, peaking at No. 15 in Canada, No. 17 in the United States, and No. 43 in Australia. Overall, the single has sold over seven million units worldwide.

Production and influence
The music for "More and More" was written by Nosie Katzmann, Giora Schein and Oliver Reinecke. Lyrics were written by front man/rapper Tony Dawson-Harrison (Captain Hollywood) and Nosie Katzmann. As executive producer of the single, Harrison worked with the collaborating production teams known as DMP (including Katzmann) and Cyborg (Marc Kamradt and Frank Schlingloff). Harrison chose singer Nina Gerhard to provide the chorus vocals for the track. His voice was electronically modified to sound deeper and this would also later inspire the producers of M.C. Sar & The Real McCoy.

American entertainment company BuzzFeed ranked "More and More" at No. 81 in their "The 101 Greatest Dance Songs Of the '90s" list in 2017.

Chart performance
Upon its release on 29 July 1992, "More and More" became a hit in several countries in Europe. In Germany, it reached No. 1 for four weeks. The single was also a Top 10 hit in Austria, Belgium, Denmark, France, Greece, Italy, the Netherlands, Norway, Sweden and Switzerland. In the United Kingdom, it reached No. 23 in its third week on the UK Singles Chart, on 14 November 1993. On the Eurochart Hot 100, the song reached No. 3. Outside Europe, it peaked at No. 5 in Israel, No. 16 in Zimbabwe, and was also a crossover pop hit in the United States, where it reached No. 17 on the Billboard Hot 100. The song remained in the top 40 for 12 weeks. By 1993, the single charted at No. 1 for two weeks on the Billboard Maxi singles charts, outselling Janet Jackson's "That's the Way Love Goes". It was awarded with a platinum record in Germany, after 500,000 singles were sold and a gold record in Greece.

Critical reception
Larry Flick from Billboard described it as "a seductive pop/house affair that only lightly nicks the surface of the Captain's obvious talent for combining complex groove patterns with simple, brain-embedding hooks and melodies." He added that "the beats are rugged, and are topped by a breezy, radio-minded R&B melody. The give-and-take between sultry female vocals and deepthroated male rapping is appropriately seductive." Dave Sholin from the Gavin Report commented, "Germany, not Hollywood, is home to The Captain, who has already racked up enough chart activity to become this week's RECORD TO WATCH. Many are comparing this production to Snap's "Rhythm Is A Dancer" with its Euro-dance feel. One very hot entry!" 

James Masterton stated in his weekly UK chart commentary, that "More and More" "is in all honesty one of the more inspiring dance records this year and deserves a greater chart position than it looks like achieving." Pan-European magazine Music & Media also compared it to Snap!'s 1992 hit, noting that they used the same recipe. They added further that "the basis is 1982 type of electro pop strengthened by dance elements such as a male rapper and female backing vocalists." Martin Pearson from Music Weeks RM Dance Update noted "the trance-drenched moodiness" of the song, stating that it "is a musical barrage, right down to the laser-guided bassline and armour-plated pop hook."

Music video
Two different music videos were produced to promote the single. One of them was directed by Bruce Ashley. One of the videos was later published on YouTube in March 2017. It had generated more than 52 million views as of December 2022.

Track listings

 German maxi-CD single and Australian CD single "More and More" – 6:20
 "More and More" (trance mix) – 6:08
 "More and More" (single version) – 4:11

 Dutch 7-inch singleA. "More and More" (single version) – 4:11
B. "More and More" – 6:20

 UK 12-inch singleA1. "More and More" (Red Underground vocal mix) – 6:28
A2. "More and More" (Red Underground dub) – 6:28
B1. "More and More" (Trance to Dance mix) – 6:08
B2. "More and More" (original club mix) – 6:20

 UK maxi-CD single "More and More" (radio mix) – 4:08
 "More and More" (12-inch version) – 6:20
 "More and More" (trance version) – 6:08
 "More and More" (Karizma remix) – 6:58
 "More and More" (remix instrumental) – 6:10

 US and Canadian maxi-CD single'''
 "More and More" – 6:20
 "More and More" (underground mix) – 7:23
 "More and More" (SoBe Mix) – 6:00
 "More and More" (underground instrumental mix) – 7:23

Charts

Weekly charts

Year-end charts

Certifications

Release history

ReferencesThe Billboard Book of Top 40 Hits'', 6th Edition, 1996

1992 songs
1992 debut singles
1993 singles
Black-and-white music videos
Blow Up singles
Captain Hollywood Project songs
Number-one singles in Germany
Songs written by Nosie Katzmann
Songs written by Tony Dawson-Harrison